The United States federal budget for fiscal year 2020 ran from October 1, 2019 to September 30, 2020. The government was initially funded through a series of two temporary continuing resolutions.  The final funding package was passed as two consolidated spending bills in December 2019, the Consolidated Appropriations Act, 2020 and the Further Consolidated Appropriations Act, 2020.  A series of supplemental appropriations bills was passed beginning in March 2020 in response to the COVID-19 pandemic.

Budget proposals 
The Trump administration's budget proposal was released on March 11, 2019.

On August 1, 2019, the Bipartisan Budget Act of 2019 was passed by the House. The next day, on August 2, 2019, the bill was passed by the Senate and signed into law by President Trump. This act increases spending by $320 billion over levels set in the Budget Control Act of 2011 and removes the possibility of budget sequestration.

Appropriations legislation 
On September 26, 2019, Congress passed the Continuing Appropriations Act, 2020, and Health Extenders Act of 2019 which contained a continuing resolution lasting until November 21.  On November 21, Congress passed the Further Continuing Appropriations Act, 2020, and Further Health Extenders Act of 2019 which extended temporary funding until December 20.

A final appropriations deal was announced on December 16.  The appropriations legislation was divided into two bills: the Consolidated Appropriations Act, 2020 contained the appropriations acts for Defense, Commerce–Justice–Science, Financial Services and General Government, and Homeland Security, while the Further Consolidated Appropriations Act, 2020 contained the remaining acts.

Supplemental appropriations were passed in response to the COVID-19 pandemic:

 Coronavirus Preparedness and Response Supplemental Appropriations Act, 2020, passed on March 6, 2020
 Families First Coronavirus Response Act , passed on March 18
 Coronavirus Aid, Relief, and Economic Security Act passed on March 27
 Paycheck Protection Program and Health Care Enhancement Act passed on April 24

Major initiatives 

 $1.4 billion was provided for the Mexico–United States barrier, the same as the previous year.  No provision was included to ban the transfer of funds from other accounts to barrier construction, but the $3.6 billion the Trump administration had previously transferred from military construction accounts was not replaced.
 Taxes for Cadillac insurance plans and medical devices and a health insurance fee were all permanently repealed.
 The Export–Import Bank of the United States was extended for seven years.
 $12.5 million is provided to each of the National Institutes of Health and Centers for Disease Control and Prevention for research into gun violence.  The 1996 Dickey Amendment, which banned using federal funds to advocate for gun control, had the effect of stopping federal research on gun violence despite it not being specifically banned.  The 2020 appropriations legislation retained the Dickey Amendment, but clarified that it does not prohibit federal gun violence research.
 Science research funding was increased for several agencies.  Funding for the National Institutes of Health was increased 7%, the National Science Foundation by 2.5%, the Department of Energy Office of Science by 6.3%, ARPA-E by 17%, NASA space science by 3.4%, National Institute of Standards and Technology by 4%, Agricultural Research Service by 8.5%, and basic research programs at the Department of Defense by 3%.
 Military and federal civilian employee pay was increased 3.1%.
 $425 million was provided for election security grants.
 The SECURE Act, which liberalized access to retirement plans, was enacted as part of the bill.
 The age limit for use of tobacco was raised to 21 nationwide.
 Enactment of the CREATES Act

Total revenue

Receipts

Receipts by source: (in billions of dollars)

See also

 2020s in United States political history

References

External links
Appropriations for Fiscal Year 2020
Presidential budget request
 Consolidated Appropriations Act, 2020 as amended (PDF/details) in the GPO Statute Compilations collection
 Consolidated Appropriations Act, 2020 as enacted (PDF/details) in the US Statutes at Large
 Further Consolidated Appropriations Act, 2020 as amended (PDF/details) in the GPO Statute Compilations collection
 Further Consolidated Appropriations Act, 2020 as enacted (PDF/details) in the US Statutes at Large

United States federal budget
Budget
2020
Budget